The Men's 100m athletics events for the 2016 Summer Paralympics take place at the Estádio Olímpico João Havelange from September 8 to September 16, 2016. A total of 16 events were contested over this distance, and entry was open in 19 classifications.

Schedule

Medal summary
The following is a summary of the medals awarded across all 100 metres events. 2 World records, and a further 6 Paralympic Games records were set during the sixteen finals.

Results

The following were the results of the finals only of each of the Men's 100 metres events in each of the classifications. Further details of each event, including where appropriate heats and semi finals results, are available on that event's dedicated page.

T11

The final in this classification took place at 19:02, local time, 11 September 2016:

T12

The final in this classification took place at 18:10 local time, 15 September 2016:

T13

T33

The final in this classification took place at 22:12, local time, 11 September 2016:

T34

The final in this classification took place at 18:38, local time, 12 September 2016:

T35

The final in this classification took place at 17:30 local time, 9 September 2016:

T36

The final in this classification took place at 10 September 2016 at 17:38 local time.

T37

The final in this classification took place at 10:52, local time, 11 September 2016:

T38

The final in this classification took place at 10:43, local time, 13 September 2016:

T42

The final in this classification took place at 18:17 local time, 15 September 2016:

T44

The final were completed 10 September 2016 at 00:58 local time. Final (+0.1 m/s).

T47

The final were completed 11 September 2016 at 15:45 local time. Final (0.0 m/s).

T51

The final were completed 13 September 2016 at 15:36 local time. Final (-0.4 m/s).

T53

The final were completed 100 September 2016 at 00:22 local time. Final (-0.1 m/s).

T54

The final in this classification took place at 19:37 local time, 17 September 2016:

References

Athletics at the 2016 Summer Paralympics
2016
2016 in men's athletics